David M. Rogers may refer to:
 David McGregor Rogers (1772–1824), farmer and political figure in Upper Canada
 David Rogers (librarian) (1917–1995), head of Special Collections at the Bodleian Library
 Dave Rogers (Massachusetts politician), American state legislator serving in the Massachusetts House of Representatives